Applied Mechanics Reviews is a bimonthly peer-reviewed scientific journal established in 1948 by The American Society of Mechanical Engineers.  The editor-in-chief is Harry Dankowicz (University of Illinois Urbana-Champaign).

Abstracting and indexing 
The journal is abstracted and indexed in Science Citation Index, Current Contents/Engineering, Computing & Technology, Chemical Abstracts Service, and Scopus. According to the Journal Citation Reports, the journal has a 2020 impact factor of 7.281.

References

External links 
 

American Society of Mechanical Engineers academic journals
Bimonthly journals
English-language journals
Mechanical engineering journals
Publications established in 1948